Intent to Kill is a 1992 action, independent and thriller film (released in 1993) directed by Charles T. Kanganis. The film is about drug trafficking, prostitution and police activity. Intent to Kill is rated NC-17 by the United States' Motion Picture Association of America, the reason being extreme violence. This was the first motion picture that received the MPAA NC-17 rating because of violence rather than sexual content.

Plot
Police detective Vicki Stewart goes undercover as a prostitute for a drug operation. Her police sidekick and husband searches for drugs along with her. But then the drug operation goes sour, the thugs begin shooting at the police and vehicles begin exploding into flames. A drug dealer named Salvador, member of a ruthless gang named the Colombian Cowboys, gets away, although he forgets his drugs which are worth around $5 million.

The following morning at the Los Angeles Police Station, Vicki Stewart and the police captain question and deal with Maria, a Hispanic prostitute, who tells them several men raped her. The police captain, though, does not believe her and prevents Maria from filing charges against the rapists. Maria and Vicki get into the latter's Pontiac Grand Prix 2-door coupe. Vicki uses her nightstick and beats the rapists with the weapon. She then enters the house and confronts the fifth suspect, who is using cocaine. When the fifth suspect orders Vicki to remove every last one of her clothes, she pulls out her gun and fires one shot towards the table, with one bullet striking the glass container. She tells the suspect to pick up the telephone.

Due to Salvador getting away, the bombings and the shootings, Captain Jackson takes Vicki off the case.

Meanwhile, Salvador gets orders from his boss, The Mooch, to get back the drugs within one week or he (Salvador) will die.

Over the course of time, numerous people are bumped off (in other words: killed) in the city as Salvador and his gang friends go looking for the drugs.

Vicki goes to the city park; she then returns home and finds her husband cheating on her with a brunette woman. She then takes her husband's car from the garage, pours some gasoline on it and then sets the car on fire.

Vicki is also teaching martial arts classes to other women in street self-defense.

Later, a serious police-thug gunfight erupts; several police officers are killed, including Vicki's new partner and boyfriend. Salvador drives away in a stolen police car. Vicki follows him. They drive until both cars hit the trailer of a semi-truck and turn over.

Both Vicki and Salvador exit the overturned police cars. Vicki shoots Salvador dead in the street.

Cast

 Traci Lords as Vicki Stewart
 Yaphet Kotto as Captain Jackson
 Scott Patterson as Al
 Elena Sahagun as Mia
 Sabrina Ferrand as Maria
 Kevin Benton as Black Drug Dealer
 Angelo Tiffe as Salvador
 John Del Rico as Mooch's Trigger Man

Production
Ken Blakey was the motion picture's director of photography. Other people involved with the production of Intent to Kill were Joseph Merhi (the American film producer), Charla Driver, Stephen Lieb, Jean Levine and Richard Pepin. Kanganis and Pepin were also associated with the screenplay of the film.

Release and classification in outside countries
Under the Australian Classification Board when the film Intent to Kill was released onto videotape, the rating officials marked it MA15+, the reason being "Medium level violence, coarse language and drug use"; the decision was made during early-to-mid May 1994. Before being released onto VHS within the United Kingdom, Intent to Kill was trimmed by around sixteen or seventeen seconds before it was assigned with the "18" film rating from British Board of Film Classification officials; the editing was in November 1993. Netherlands (Dutch) film rating system officials had the film marked harmful for audiences age sixteen and under due to its strong profanity, drug abuse and drug trafficking. Under New Zealand Office of Film and Literature Classification, Intent to Kill was assigned with an "M" rating due to violence and offensive language.

References

External links

1992 independent films
1992 films
American action thriller films
American thriller drama films
American independent films
Fictional portrayals of the Los Angeles Police Department
Films about drugs
Films directed by Charles T. Kanganis
Films about law enforcement in the United States
Films about the illegal drug trade
Films set in Los Angeles
1990s thriller drama films
1992 drama films
1990s English-language films
1990s American films